The Jerome Cooperative Creamery is a cooperative creamery and also refers to historic lava rock structures used by the creamery on Birch Street in Jerome, Idaho, United States. The structures were listed on the National Register of Historic Places on September 8, 1983. They were built in 1915, 1924, and 1933 by master stonemason H.T. Pugh who popularized the use of lava rock in the Jerome area.

The Jerome Cooperative Creamery paid  to local farmers for butterfat in 1926. The creamery produced  of butter that year. In 1939, the creamery paid  for butterfat. Roy D. Smith was the manager of the creamery for 38 years from the early 1920s until the late 1950s.

See also
 List of National Historic Landmarks in Idaho
 National Register of Historic Places listings in Jerome County, Idaho

References

External links

 
 Photograph by Galen R. Frysinger of 1933 lava rock structure at Jerome Cooperative Creamery

1915 establishments in Idaho
Buildings and structures in Jerome County, Idaho
Industrial buildings and structures on the National Register of Historic Places in Idaho
Industrial buildings completed in 1915
Lava rock buildings and structures
National Register of Historic Places in Jerome County, Idaho